Sankariya is a small village in Sanchore tehsil of Jalore district in Rajasthan, India. 
There are 3 wards in the village.

Villages in Jalore district